Gerald Patrick Desmond Hartigan (30 December 1884 – 7 January 1955) was a South African cricketer who played in five Test matches from 1912 to 1914.

A right-arm fast medium bowler and right-hand batsman, Hartigan made his first-class career with Border, taking 92 wickets and scoring three centuries. His best of 176 came against Eastern Province in 1910–11.

He also played six matches of soccer for South Africa.

References

External links
 

1884 births
1955 deaths
South Africa Test cricketers
South African cricketers
Border cricketers
Sportspeople from Qonce
South African soccer players
South Africa international soccer players
Association football forwards